Chrysoritis orientalis, the eastern opal, is a species of butterfly in the family Lycaenidae. It is endemic to South Africa, where it is found on the southern Drakensberg in KwaZulu-Natal.

The wingspan is 18–22 mm for males and 20–24 mm for females. Adults are on wing from October to January, with a peak in December. There is one generation per year.

The larvae feed on Thesium species. They are attended to by Crematogaster liengmei ants.

References

Chrysoritis
Butterflies described in 1976
Endemic butterflies of South Africa
Taxonomy articles created by Polbot